Sabin Rai is a Nepali singer and lyricist who is called as the Bryan Adams of Nepal because of the voice. His first successful single was "Komal Tyo Timro" from the album Sataha.  Although his song "Ekai Aakash Muni" was released before Sataha.  He has performed concerts in Australia, Hong Kong, United Kingdom, United States, South Korea, Bahrain, Singapore, Thailand, Japan, Denmark, Finland, and India. Rai known for his stage performances and the interest he brings in his old songs by singing in different style. Now he has his own band called "Sabin Rai & The Pharaoh".

Achievements 

 2003 AD – Best Album of the Year- Sataha- Hits FM
 2003 AD – Best New Artist of the Year- Sataha- Image Channel
 2004 AD – Best New Artist of the Year- Channel Nepal
 2007 AD – Best Pop Composition- (Samjhana Harulai)
 2007 AD – Best Vocal Performance- Ma Sansar Jitne
 2009 AD – Chinnalata Award.
 2015 AD – Best Song of the Year- Timi Nai Hau-(Sabin Rai & The Pharaoh) Hits FM

Discography

Albums
 2001 – Nine
 2003 – Sataha
 2004 – Sabin Rai Remixes
 2006 – Sataha 2
 2010 – Ranga Manch Ko Rang
 2019 – Dhanyabaad

Songs
 Komal Tyo Timro
 Afno Katha
 Maya 
 Gurans Ko Fed Muni
 Samjhana Haru Lai
 Jau Ki Basu 
 Timi Nai Hau 
 Namuna
 Dui Thunga
 Ma Sansar Jitne
 Malai Angali Deu
 Timro Saath
 Timro Lagi Ma
 Timi Nai Mero
 Din Ra Raat
 Kalo Kalo Raat Ko
 Maya Jalaima
 Kina Ki Ma Maya Garchu
 Jaba Timi Ayeu
 Ekai Aakash Muni
 Samjhanchu
 Paisa 
 Dhanyebad

References

External links
 NepaliSongChord.com – Guitar chords and tabs of Sabin Rai's Songs

1974 births
Living people
Rock guitarists
21st-century Nepalese male singers
People from Dharan
21st-century guitarists
Nepalese rock singers
Rai people